Saint-Sébastien is a municipality in Le Granit Regional County Municipality in the Estrie region of Quebec, Canada. It is named after Saint Sebastian, who died c. 288.

References

External links

Municipalities in Quebec
Incorporated places in Estrie
Le Granit Regional County Municipality